The Mikai-class (ミカイ) locomotives were a group of steam tender locomotives of the Chosen Government Railway (Sentetsu) with 2-8-2 wheel arrangement. The "Mika" name came from the American naming system for steam locomotives, under which locomotives with 2-8-2 wheel arrangement were called "Mikado" in honour of the Emperor of Japan, as the first 2-8-2 locomotives in the world were built for Japan.

Of all Mika classes, 131 went to the Korean National Railroad in South Korea and 292 to the Korean State Railway in North Korea. Of these 423 locomotives, 356 were from Sentetsu; the other 67 were South Manchuria Railway Mikai-class engines on loan to Sentetsu along with Mika-type locomotives which had previously belonged to the twelve privately owned railways in Korea before 1945. Not included in this number, however, are the six SMR Mikai-class locomotives that were assigned to SMR's Rajin depot for operation on SMR's lines in northeastern Korea, and the eight SMR Mikaro-class locomotives likewise assigned to the Rajin depot; these fourteen locomotives were taken over by the Korean State Railway. Despite the DPRK government's extensive anti-Japanese propaganda, the railway nevertheless continues to use the "Mika" name officially for these locomotives even though it refers to the Japanese emperor.

Description
By the late 1910s, existing multipurpose locomotives were proving insufficient for the increasingly heavy freight trains being run in Korea. To fill the need for dedicated freight locomotives, in 1919 Sentetsu imported twelve Mikai-class and twelve Mikani-class locomotives from the United States in 1919.

The Mikai class was one of the original two groups of 2-8-2 locomotives to be delivered to Sentetsu in 1919, the other being the Mikani class built by ALCo. Built by Baldwin in 1919, the Mikai class were used primarily on the Gyeongui Line. Originally numbered ミカイ701-ミカイ712, in Sentetsu's general renumbering of 1938 they became ミカイ1-ミカイ12

Postwar
After the division of Sentetsu's assets in 1948, three remained in the North with the Korean State Railway as class 미가하 (Migaha) and later renumbered in the 6000 series, and nine in the South with the Korean National Railroad as class 미카1 (Mika1);  

Some of the KNR's Mika1s were rebuilt in the early 1950s by Kawasaki to use lignite as fuel, becoming the KNR Mika6 (미카6) class.

Both the KNR and the Korean State Railway operated Mikai class locomotives that formerly belonged to the South Manchuria Railway (Mantetsu). These were very distinct from the Sentetsu Mikai class, but in both North and South they were grouped together with the Sentetsu Mikais as class Migaha and Mika1 respectively.

Construction

References

Locomotives of Korea
Locomotives of South Korea
Locomotives of North Korea
Railway locomotives introduced in 1919
2-8-2 locomotives
Baldwin locomotives